Thomas de Grey, 4th Baron Walsingham (Chelsea 10 April 1778 – Merton, Norfolk, 8 September 1839) was Archdeacon of Winchester from 1807 until 1814; and then of Surrey from 1814 until his death.

The 2nd son of Thomas de Grey, 2nd Baron Walsingham, he was educated at Eton and St John's College, Cambridge. He held livings at Aston Abbotts, Merton, Bishopstoke, Fawley, Weeke and Calbourne.

He succeeded his brother George de Grey, 3rd Baron Walsingham, in 1831 when the latter was killed with his wife as the result of a house fire at his London Home, inheriting the barony and the family seat of Merton Hall, Norfolk.

He died in 1839 and was buried at Merton, Norfolk. He had married in 1802 Elizabeth North, the daughter of Rt Rev Hon Brownlow North DD, Bishop of Winchester. They had six sons and three daughters. He was succeeded by his eldest son Thomas de Grey, 5th Baron Walsingham.

Notes

1778 births
1839 deaths
People from Chelsea, London
People educated at Eton College
Alumni of St John's College, Cambridge
Archdeacons of Winchester (ancient)
Archdeacons of Surrey
Thomas 4
People from Breckland District
Burials in Norfolk